Timbellus levii is a species of sea snail, a marine gastropod mollusk in the family Muricidae, the murex snails or rock snails.

Description
The shell grows to a length of 20 mm.

Distribution
This species is found in the Pacific Ocean along New Caledonia.

References

 Houart, R. (1988). Description of seven new species of Muricidae (Neagastropoda) from the south-western Pacific Ocean. Venus. 47(3): 185-196
 Merle D., Garrigues B. & Pointier J.-P. (2011) Fossil and Recent Muricidae of the world. Part Muricinae. Hackenheim: Conchbooks. 648 pp. page(s): 133

External links
 

Muricidae
Gastropods described in 1988